Sigil is free, open-source editing software for e-books in the EPUB format.

As a cross-platform application, Sigil is distributed for the Windows, macOS, Haiku and Linux platforms under the GNU GPL license. Sigil supports code-based editing of EPUB files, as well as the import of HTML and plain text files. A companion application, PageEdit, allows WYSIWYG editing of EPUB files.

Sigil has been developed by Strahinja Val Marković and others since 2009. From July 2011 to June 2015 John Schember was the lead developer. In June 2015 development of Sigil was taken over by Kevin Hendricks and Doug Massay.

Features 
Sigil's features include:
 Full UTF-16 and EPUB 2 specification support
 Multiple views: book, code and preview view
 Table of contents generator with multi-level heading support
 Metadata editor with full support for all metadata entries
 Hunspell based spell checking with default and user configurable dictionaries
 Full regular expression (PCRE) support for find and replace
 Supports import of EPUB and HTML files, images, and style sheets
 Integrated API to external HTML and graphics editors
 FlightCrew validator for EPUB standard compliance validation (separate plugin)

Sigil has full EPUB 2 specifications support, but only limited EPUB 3 support. Since version 0.9.3 of January 2016, the developers have been focusing on "improving Sigil’s ability to work with and generate epub3 ebooks without losing any of its epub2 capabilities".

WYSIWYG editing in book view was discontinued in 2019 and moved to a separate application, PageEdit.

See also 
 Calibre (software)
List of free and open-source software packages

References

External links 

 
 
 Old code repository
 Sigil development blog
 Ebook editing with Sigil LWN.net, 2011

EPUB readers
Free application software
Cross-platform free software
MacOS text-related software
Windows text-related software
Linux text-related software
Typesetting software
Desktop publishing software
Software that uses Qt